Arnoldus Mauritius Blignaut (born 1 August 1978) is a former Zimbabwean cricketer, who played all formats of the game. He was a right-arm fast-medium bowler, also known as a hard-hitting batsman in ODIs, where he frequently scored a fast rate; though he was seldom able to sustain this form and keeping his wicket intact through many overs. He more often played ODIs, where many runs in a short time are desired, than Tests.

International career
On his Test debut, he took five wickets in the first innings against Bangladesh in Bulawayo in 2001. Blignaut took a hat-trick against Bangladesh in a Test match at Harare on 22 February 2004. He is the only bowler to take a Test hat-trick for Zimbabwe.

Like Travis Friend and Henry Olonga before him, Blignaut was one of the few Zimbabwean bowlers who could exceed 90 mph. In a land full of medium-fast bowlers, Blignaut (on his day) formed a lethal opening combination with the dependable Heath Streak, often rushing the batsmen for pace off the wicket. In an ODI against England at Durham in 2003, he bowled a 93 mph thunderbolt to England allrounder Andrew Flintoff. In the same game, however, he went at 10 runs an over, getting neither his line nor his length right. 
He remained Zimbabwe's wild card, especially in the shorter formats, with the ability to either win or lose a game in a matter of overs.

After playing the series against New Zealand and India in 2005, he withdrew from Zimbabwe selection because he had not been paid.

His ODI strike-rate is over 100, with a high score of 63 not out, and an average of just 19. His bowling average is just above 41, with best bowling figures of 4/43, and an economy of 5.34. He was also a fine fielder.

Domestic career
In the Australian season 2004–05, Blignaut was contracted to play for Tasmania. Injury and poor form prevented him from playing all but a couple of games for the state. He even struggled to make an impact at club level. Eventually he returned to Zimbabwe to re-join the Test side. The second year of his contract with Tasmania was cancelled.

He signed a contract with South African domestic side Highveld Lions for 2006 season. After 2006, he disappeared from cricket for a few years before returning in 2010 for a few matches for Zimbabwe.

After cricket
He works in the family business in South Africa and Zimbabwe.

References

External links
  
 "Andy Blignaut: 11 Interesting Facts to Know about the Zimbabwean All-Rounder"

Zimbabwean cricketers
1978 births
Living people
Cricketers from Harare
Alumni of Eaglesvale High School
Afrikaner people
White Zimbabwean sportspeople
Zimbabwean expatriates in South Africa
Zimbabwean people of South African descent
Zimbabwe Test cricketers
Test cricket hat-trick takers
Cricketers who have taken five wickets on Test debut
Zimbabwe One Day International cricketers
Cricketers at the 2003 Cricket World Cup
Zimbabwe Twenty20 International cricketers
Durham cricketers
Lions cricketers
Mashonaland cricketers
Mashonaland A cricketers
Tasmania cricketers